5 Star Specials is a weekly drama anthology aired every Wednesday evenings on TV5 from March 22 to September 1, 2010. This is featuring the talents of the station.

Season one

The Diamond Star (Maricel Soriano)

Ang Dalawa Kong Nanay
 Air Date: March 22, 2010
 Starring: Roderick Paulate, Kim Dinosaur, Aliyah de Riva & Carlos Morales
 Directed by: Soxie Topacio, Directors Guild of the Philippines, Inc. (DGPI)

Putik
 Air Date: March 29, 2010
 Starring: Nash Aguas & Perla Bautista
 Directed by: Rahyan Carlos

Dedma si Lolo
 Air Date: April 5, 2010
 Starring: Eddie Garcia & Jay Manalo Guest: John Manalo
 Directed by: Mel Chionglo

Bigti
 Air Date: April 12, 2010
 Starring: Cherry Pie Picache, Edgar Allan Guzman, Jade Lopez & Marky Lopez
 Directed by: Eric Quizon

Girl, Boy, Bakla, Tomboy
 Air Date: April 19, 2010
 Starring: Eric Quizon, Jim Pebangco, Lorie Mara, JL Dizon, Niña Jose, Allen Dizon
 Directed by: Joel Lamangan, DGPI

Season two

Ruffa (Ruffa Gutierrez)

For Better or For Worse
 Air Date: April 26, 2010
 Starring: Zoren Legaspi
 Directed by: Eric Quizon

Taong Bahay
 Air Date: May 3, 2010
 Starring: Paolo Contis
 Directed by: Jose Javier Reyes

Who's the boss
 Air Date: May 19, 2010
 Starring: Jomari Yllana, Carla Humphries
 Directed by: Joel Lamangan, DGPI

Venganza
 Air Date: May 26, 2010
 Starring: Phillip Salvador, Rochelle Barrameda, Jenny Miller, Victor Basa
 Directed by: Argel Joseph

Preso
 Air Date: June 2, 2010
 Starring: Ian de Leon, Miriam Quiambao
 Directed by: Gina Alajar

Ang Bestfriend kong Kabit
 Air Date: June 9, 2010
 Starring: Aiko Melendez, Jon Avila
 Directed by: Jose Javier Reyes

Season three

JC (JC De Vera)

Tato-45
 Air Date: June 16, 2010
 Starring: Gardo Versoza
 Directed by: Giuseppe Bede Sampedro

Kardong Kamao
 Air Date: June 23, and September 1, 2010 (replay)
 Starring: Sylvia Sanchez, Soliman Cruz, Spanky Manikan
 Directed by: Robert Quebral

Johnny Salamangkero
 Air Date: June 30 and July 7, 2010
 Starring: Carla Humphries, Joross Gamboa, Michelle Madrigal, Charee Pineda
 Directed by: Argel Joseph

Gabriel Molave
 Air Date: July 21 and July 28, 2010
 Starring: Megan Young and Epy Quizon
 Directed by: Eric Quizon

Jak en Poy
 Air Date: August 4, 2010
 Starring: Empoy Marquez
 Directed by: Robert Quebral

Papa Rusty
 Air Date: August 11, 2010
 Starring: Jaime Fabregas, Giselle Sanchez, Vandolf Quizon, Stef Prescott, Candy Pangilinan, Jairus Aquino
 Directed by: Giuseppe Bede Sampedro

Si Paco at ang Prinsesa
 Air Date: August 18, 2010
 Starring: Carmen Soo, Diane Medina
 Directed by: Bb. Joyce Bernal

Si Ali, si Oli at si Tommy
 Air Date: August 25, 2010
 Starring: Ruffa Gutierrez, Arci Muñoz
 Directed by: Jose Javier Reyes

References

Lists of anthology television series episodes
Lists of Philippine drama television series episodes